The Mike and Marian Ilitch Humanitarian Award was an annual award given out at the conclusion of the Central Collegiate Hockey Association regular season to the league's top citizen.

The Award was donated by and named after Mike and Marian Ilitch, a pair of wealthy Detroit-based businesspeople who well known both for their philanthropic efforts as well as their ownership of the Detroit Red Wings and Detroit Tigers. The Mike and Marian Ilitch Humanitarian Award was first bestowed in 2001 and every year thereafter until 2013 when the CCHA was dissolved as a consequence of the Big Ten forming its men's ice hockey conference.

Award winners

Winners by school

Winners by position

See also
CCHA Awards

References

General

Specific

External links
CCHA Awards (Incomplete)

College ice hockey trophies and awards in the United States
Awards established in 2001
Awards disestablished in 2013
2001 establishments in the United States
2013 disestablishments in the United States
Central Collegiate Hockey Association